Bob's Stores is a chain of retail stores in the northeastern United States owned by GoDigital Media Group. Founded as Bob's Surplus in Middletown, Connecticut, by Robert "Bob" Lapidus in 1954, the chain expanded gradually until it was acquired by TJX in 2003 and has been reacquired twice more since then. The chain targets moderate-income customers with a selection of footwear, workwear, teamwear, and activewear.

History

Early years 
In 1954, Bob Lapidus opened Bob's Surplus on Main Street in Middletown, Connecticut. His original business strategy was to "Treat all customers with respect and dignity and they will return again and again". As Bob's Surplus increased in popularity, its location was hindering its growth; in 1962, Lapidus moved the store to a larger building across the street. In 1967, the store was forced to move again after a fire destroyed the building.

1970s, 1980s, and early 1990s 
In 1975, the second Bob's Surplus was opened in Enfield, Connecticut; the third store was opened in Hamden, Connecticut, in 1981. The chain renamed itself "Bob's Stores" in 1985, and began changing its marketing strategy by emphasizing quality and adding casual activewear to its list of products. In 1990, the chain had expanded to five stores; that year, it was acquired by the Melville Corporation (now CVS Corporation). Bob's expanded rapidly under the corporation; by March 1, 1996 the chain had grown to 34 stores across the northeastern United States. During this period, Melville considered Bob's Stores a key company, stating that they were spending time to "lay a solid base for rapid expansion for Bob's Stores in the years ahead". Bob's Stores remained most popular in its origin state of Connecticut.

Bob's Surplus logo t-shirts 
In the 1970s and early 1980s the Bob's Surplus circular logo was featured on a line of very popular t-shirts that were sold inexpensively or given away for free at their stores.  Both the t-shirts themselves and the Bob's Surplus logo that was printed on them were available in a large variety of color combinations.  When the name of the chain was changed to Bob's Stores in 1985, the word "Surplus" on the logo was switched to "Stores"; however, sometime in the late 1980s a new rectangular Bob's Stores logo was introduced that the company still uses as of October 2018 (see the logo in the top right corner of this webpage).  T-shirts with the new rectangular Bob's Stores logo—again in various color combinations—were also sold or given as freebies at their locations in the late 1980s and early 1990s.

Late 1990s 

In 1997, Melville sold all of its chains except CVS Pharmacy; Bob's Stores was sold to the chain's management and Citicorp Venture Capital. In 1999, the upper executive level of the chain experienced numerous changes in personnel. Many others in the company became concerned with competition from stores like Kohl's, which began entering Bob's market area in late 1999 by acquiring many former Caldor locations following that chain's liquidation (as well as other stores). However, Bob's focus on sports team-related apparel was considered a strength during this period; one Bob's executive stated that the lack of a consistent national sports champion in the late 1990s hurt larger chains more than they hurt Bob's Stores, because consumers were more interested in regional teams (which the chain supplies). In 2000, Bob's Stores created its first website.

2003 bankruptcy and TJX acquisition 
In 2003, Bob's Stores went bankrupt. In late 2003, Dick's Sporting Goods outbid companies such as TJX Companies and tried to buy the chain for over $113 million. Dick's had intended to close most of the Bob's Stores locations. TJX felt that this was unfair to the employees and TJX brought it to court in Maine. The courts sided with TJX to save the thousands of jobs that would have been lost and TJX was allowed to purchase the chain for $113 million. TJX Companies expressed interest in Bob's Stores because it shared similar characteristics to other TJX chains, including large stores and similar brands. Although there were also numerous differences between Bob's Stores and TJX's other chains, one expert felt that this would help diversify TJX's lineup.

Sale and bankruptcy 
On August 19, 2008, TJX announced they would sell Bob's to private equity firms Versa Capital Management and Crystal Capital. Bob's Stores launched an online store June 1, 2012.

In April 2016, Vestis Retail Group, the Versa Capital-owned unit which owns the Sport Chalet and Eastern Mountain Sports sporting goods chains as well as Bob's, announced that it had filed for bankruptcy protection and reorganization under Chapter 11 of the United States Bankruptcy Code.  Vestis said it would reorganize and focus on the operations of Eastern Mountain and Bob's, while all Sports Chalet stores would close.

Sports Direct acquisition 
On April 19, 2017, after expanding to nearly 50 stores at its peak, Sports Direct International plc (Sports Direct) received permission to acquire Bob's Stores and Eastern Mountain Sports following Eastern Outfitters LLC's Chapter 11 filing.  9 out of 13 stores in Connecticut alone were scheduled for closure.

GoDigital acquisition 
In May 2022, Bob's Stores and Eastern Mountain Sports was acquired by GoDigital Media Group as part of its strategy to generate synergy between content, community and commerce.

References

External links
 
 Demographics breakdown for the company website

American companies established in 1954
Retail companies established in 1954
1954 establishments in Connecticut
Companies based in New Haven County, Connecticut
Meriden, Connecticut
Sports Direct
Companies that filed for Chapter 11 bankruptcy in 2016
Companies that filed for Chapter 11 bankruptcy in 2017